The 2008 Recopa Sudamericana (officially the 2008 Recopa Visa Sudamericana for sponsorship reasons) was the 16th Recopa Sudamericana, an annual football match between the winners of the previous season's Copa Libertadores and Copa Sudamericana competitions.

The match was contested by Boca Juniors, winners of the 2007 Copa Libertadores, and Arsenal, winners of the 2007 Copa Sudamericana. Boca Juniors won their 4th Recopa Sudamericana title after accumulating the most points over the two legs (4-1). The title ties them in first place for the most international titles won by a club with 18.

Qualified teams

Venues

Match details

First leg

Second leg

Notes

References

2008 in South American football
2008
2008–09 in Argentine football
Boca Juniors matches
Arsenal de Sarandí matches
2008